The 10th Robert Awards ceremony was held in 1993 in Copenhagen, Denmark. Organized by the Danish Film Academy, the awards honoured the best in Danish and foreign film of 1992.

Honorees

Best Danish Film 
 Pain of Love – Nils Malmros

Best Actor in a Leading Role 
 Søren Østergaard – Pain of Love

Best Actress in a Leading Role 
 Anne Louise Hassing – Pain of Love

Best Actor in a Supporting Role 
 Jesper Christensen – Sofie

Best Actress in a Supporting Role 
 Ghita Nørby – Sofie

Best Cinematography 
 Jan Weincke – Pain of Love

Production Design 
 Peter Høimark – Sofie

Costume Design 
 Jette Termann – Sofie

Best Makeup 
 Cecilia Drott – Sofie

Best Sound Design 
 Niels Arild – Pain of Love

Best Editing 
 Birger Møller Jensen – Pain of Love

Best Score 
  & Billy Cross –

Best Documentary Short 
 Hjerter i slør by Jesper W. Nielsen & Brev til Jonas by Susanne Bier

Best Foreign Film 
 Strictly Ballroom – Baz Luhrmann

See also 

 1993 Bodil Awards

References

External links 
  

1992 film awards
1993 in Denmark
Robert Awards ceremonies
1990s in Copenhagen